The Kar River is a tributary of the Wardha in Maharashtra, India.

Dams 

The Kar Dam is a medium-sized earthen dam used for irrigation of the surrounding area.

Rivers of Maharashtra
Rivers of India